Deh Yusefan-e Olya (also Romanized as Deh Yūsefān-e ‘Olyā; also known as Deh Yūsefān-e Bālā, Dīv Saffān-e ‘Olyā, and Terkeleh) is a village in Mirbag-e Jonubi Rural District, in the Central District of Delfan County, Lorestan Province, Iran. At the 2006 census, its population was 38, in 7 families.

References 

Towns and villages in Delfan County